Francisco Javier Bautista Jr. (born December 7, 1975), better known by his stage name Frankie J, is a Mexican-American singer and former member of the musical group Kumbia Kings.

Born in Mexico, he grew up in San Diego and became a freestyle artist under the stage name Frankie Boy in the late 1990s. He then joined Kumbia Kings before re-embarking on a solo career. Frankie J's solo debut album, What's a Man to Do, was released in 2003, followed by more English and Spanish language albums. He received a Grammy Award nomination for his album Faith, Hope y Amor in 2013 for Best Latin Pop Album.

Early life 
Bautista was born in Tijuana, Mexico, and raised in San Diego, California, from the age of two, after his uncle brought him and his siblings to the United States. He grew up listening to both traditional Latin music as well as American urban music. He attended Southwest Senior High School in San Diego. He later began to develop more interest in singing, with the encouragement of his family. At high school age, he began participating in talent shows and performing at school functions. He graduated high school in 1995.

Career 
Bautista's first taste of the music business was in 1993, when he was briefly signed to Canadian independent record label Ventura International Records, featuring on a song called "Margarita" by Turkish artist Atilla. In 1997, Bautista signed with the now-defunct Hola Recordings which at the time had only one artist signed to the label, the brainchild of dance music legend and producer Jellybean Benitez. At the time, he was a freestyle artist known as Frankie Boy and his music was released on three Maximum Freestyle compilations but his solo CD was shelved before release.

Kumbia Kings (1999–2003) 
In 1999, he became a member of the Kumbia Kings created by A.B. Quintanilla, brother of Selena. He performed under Cisko.

Solo career: What's a Man to Do 
Frankie J signed as a solo artist with Columbia Records and released his first album What's A Man To Do on May 27, 2003. His self-titled first Spanish-language album Frankie J was also released later in the same year. The album's lead single "Don't Wanna Try" peaked at #19 on the Billboard Hot 100 Singles Chart, while "Ya No Es Igual" went Top 10 on the World Latin charts. Later that year, he was featured in the Top 10 Billboard Hot 100 hit "Suga Suga" by rapper Baby Bash.

The One and breakthrough 
His second album The One was released on March 22, 2005. It was led by the #3 Billboard Hot 100 hit "Obsession (No Es Amor)" featuring rapper Baby Bash, and followed by the Top40 singles "How To Deal" and "More Than Words". To coincide with the release of "More Than Words", the album was re-released on the DualDisc format in October. By January 2006, The One was certified platinum by the RIAA for shipping over a million copies. His second Spanish-language album Un Nuevo Dia was released on June 13, 2006, and featured the single "Pensado En Ti".

Frankie's third English-language album, Priceless, was released on October 17, 2006. It debuted at #30 on the Billboard 200. The lead single "That Girl" featured Chamillionaire and Mannie Fresh and peaked at number 43 on the Billboard Hot 100. A second single, "Daddy's Little Girl", charted at number 23 on the Billboard Bubbling Under Hot 100 chart.

Independent route 
Following his departure from Columbia Records, Frankie J released a few singles ("Pictures", "If You Were My Girlfriend", "Crush") between 2008 and 2011, as well as starting his own label, Soulsick Records. He has also written songs for other artists, most recently the number 2 hit song "Take a Chance on Me" in the United Kingdom for boyband JLS.

He released his fourth English-language studio album Courage on December 7, 2011. The lead single "How Beautiful You Are" was released to digital retailers on October 24, 2011. The music video was directed by Mike Ho and premiered on YouTube on September 11, 2011. The video for the album's second single "And I Had You There" premiered on Frankie's YouTube channel on November 26, 2011. Frankie J and Baby Bash shot a video for the album's third single "That's Wussup" in December 2011 in San Diego, California. The video premiered on January 8, 2012.

On July 12, 2012, it was announced that Frankie J will join Jennifer Lopez and Enrique Iglesias on their joint North America tour, serving as a special guest, replacing Wisin & Yandel who were initially the opening act.

Faith, Hope y Amor and Grammy success 
In 2011, he signed with Universal Music and began work on a new Spanish-language album. He released two digital singles ("Ay, Ay, Ay" and "Tienes Que Creer En Mi"/"Take a Chance on Me") in late 2012.

In 2013, he released his new album, Faith, Hope y Amor on May 28, 2013. The album was nominated for the 56th annual Grammy Award under the category of Best Latin Pop Album. It was preceded by the release of the singles "No Te Quiero Ver Con Él" and "Beautiful" (featuring Pitbull). "Impossible" was also released as a single.

On November 26, 2015, he premiered the single "Breakin'", with a music video (in English and Spanglish) premiering on December 14. The digital single was released on December 25, 2015. Four additional singles — "Let the Music Take Control", "I Promise You", "Riches in Heaven", and "Body Rock" — followed in 2016. He announced his next album would be titled More Than the Music. Another single "Not So Dangerous" was released on December 25, 2016.

In March 2017, he scored a radio hit with "Si Una Vez (If I Once)" which was a collaboration with Play-N-Skillz, Wisin, and Leslie Grace. In June, he collaborated with Baby Bash for a new single titled "Vamonos". The following month in July, he released a new single "Lowrider" with Baby Bash, C Kan, Ozomatli & Kid Frost.

On July 27, he released his new studio album titled Eleven through his own label Soulsick Musick Inc.

Acting 
Frankie appeared as a celebrity guest at the 16th birthday party of Marissa Mishelle on MTV's My Super Sweet 16.

In 2011, he joined the mun2 television series RPM Miami as mechanic Ramon. The series was quickly renewed for a second season.

Discography

Studio albums

Collaborative albums

Singles

As lead artist

As featured artist

Guest appearances

References

External links 
Official Facebook page

1975 births
American male singer-songwriters
American hip hop singers
American male pop singers
Record producers from California
American soul singers
Columbia Records artists
Hispanic and Latino American musicians
Kumbia Kings members
American Latin pop singers
Living people
Mexican emigrants to the United States
Mexican male singers
Musicians from San Diego
People from Tijuana
Singers from Baja California
Universal Music Latin Entertainment artists
21st-century American singers
Singer-songwriters from California